The Imperial Russian Navy named at least five of its ships Retvizan. The name comes from the Swedish ship of the line Rättvisan (meaning "The Justice") which the Russians captured at the  Battle of Vyborg Bay in 1790.

  - Ex-Swedish 62-gun ship of the line, sold in 1813.
  - 74-gun ship of the line, hulked in 1824 and broken up in 1833.
  - 74-gun ship of the line, hulked in 1852.
  - Steam-powered, 81-gun ship of the line, stricken in 1880.
  - Sunk in 1904 during the Siege of Port Arthur; salvaged and put into service by the Japanese as Hizen. Sunk as a target in 1924.

Russian Navy ship names